Tamand (Romanized as Tāmand, and also known as Tūmand or Towmand) is a village in Naharjan Rural District, Mud District, Sarbisheh County, South Khorasan Province, Iran. According to the 2006 census, its population was 49 people from 18 families.

References 

Populated places in Sarbisheh County